Obert may refer to the following people:
Given name
Obert Bika (born 1993), Papua New Guinean football midfielder 
Obert Logan (1941–2003), American football safety
Obert Mpofu, Zimbabwean politician 
Obert Nyampipira (born 1966), Zimbabwean sculptor
Obert A. Olson (1882–1938), American public servant and politician 
Obert Skye, American children's writer 
Obert C. Tanner (1904–1993), American businessman
Obert C. Teigen (1908–1978), American attorney 

Surname
Alex Obert (born 1991), American water polo player 
Igor Obert (born 1982), Slovak football defender 
Jozef Obert (1938–2020), Slovak football striker
Michael Obert (born 1966), German book author and journalist 
Oscar Obert (1931–2016), American handball player

See also
 Obert, Nebraska, a village in the United States